John "Jackie" Scott (22 December 1933 – June 1978), also known as Jack Scott or Johnny Scott, was a former Northern Ireland international footballer and football manager who played as an outside forward for Manchester United, Grimsby Town and York City in the 1950s and 1960s.

Club career
Born in Belfast, Scott played football for Boyland Youth Club and Ormond Star in Northern Ireland, before moving to England as an apprentice with Manchester United. He signed his first professional contract with United in October 1951, and made his debut a year later, playing on the left wing in a 6–2 defeat to Wolverhampton Wanderers on 4 October 1952. However, due to the competition for places in the Manchester United first team, Scott's appearances were few and far between, having made just three appearances when he left for Grimsby Town in June 1956.

Scott flourished at Grimsby, his performances catching the attention of the Northern Irish selectors, who called him up for a B international in 1957, before naming him in the squad for the 1958 World Cup. However, that was to be the end of his involvement with the Northern Irish national team as he was not selected again.

Scott played for Grimsby for a total of seven seasons, making 250 appearances in all competitions and scoring 54 goals. In 1963, he was allowed to leave the club on a free transfer to York City. He played for York for one season before dropping out of the Football League to play for Margate in the Southern League. In two seasons at Margate, he played in 95 matches and scored 26 goals, before retiring to Manchester.

International career
Scott played in two matches at the 1958 FIFA World Cup; a 2–1 victory over Czechoslovakia and a 4–0 defeat to France in the quarter-finals.

Later life
Scott was killed in a building site accident in 1978, aged 44.

Career statistics
Source:

International

Honours
Grimsby Town
Third Division second-place promotion: 1961–62

References

External links
Profile at Northern Ireland's Footballing Greats
Profile at StretfordEnd.co.uk
Profile at MUFCInfo.com
Profile at grimsby-townfc.co.uk
Profile at margatefchistory.co.uk

1933 births
1978 deaths
Association footballers from Belfast
Association footballers from Northern Ireland
Northern Ireland international footballers
1958 FIFA World Cup players
Manchester United F.C. players
Grimsby Town F.C. players
York City F.C. players
Margate F.C. players
English Football League players
Association football outside forwards
Industrial accident deaths